Tubipora chamissonis is an organ coral in the family Tubiporidae. It was first described in 1834 by Christian Gottfried Ehrenberg, from a specimen collected near Radack Island (in the Marshall Islands).

References

Tubiporidae
Corals described in 1834
Taxa named by Christian Gottfried Ehrenberg